Rahul Ajay Tripathi (born 2 March 1991) is an Indian international cricketer who made his debut for Indian cricket team in January 2023 against Sri Lanka. He also plays for Maharashtra in domestic cricket and Sunrisers Hyderabad in the Indian Premier League (IPL).

Domestic Career
He was the leading run-scorer for Maharashtra in the 2018–19 Ranji Trophy, with 504 runs in eight matches.

In February 2017, he was bought by the Rising Pune Supergiants team for the 2017 Indian Premier League (IPL). In January 2018, he was bought by the Rajasthan Royals in the 2018 IPL auction. He was released by the Rajasthan Royals ahead of the 2020 IPL auction. In the 2020 IPL auction, he was bought by the Kolkata Knight Riders ahead of the 2020 Indian Premier League.

In February 2022, he was bought by the Sunrisers Hyderabad in the auction for the 2022 Indian Premier League tournament.

International career
In June 2022, he was named in India's Twenty20 International (T20I) squad for their two-match series against Ireland. The following month, he was named in India's One Day International (ODI) squad for their series against Zimbabwe. In December 2022, Tripathi was selected to play for India in the T20I series against Sri Lanka. The following month, on 5 January 2023, Tripathi made his Twenty20 International debut for India at the age of 31 against Sri Lanka in the second match of the series at Maharashtra Cricket Association Stadium, Pune, he was dismissed for 5 runs in his debut innings.

In the 3rd T20 International match against Srilanka, he scored selfless 35 runs off 16 balls, which includes 5 Fours and 2 Sixes. 

In the 3rd T20 International match against New Zealand, he smashed 44 runs of just 22 balls, which includes 4 Fours and 3 Sixes, with a brilliant strike rate of 200.

References

External links
 

1991 births
Living people
Indian cricketers
Maharashtra cricketers
People from Ranchi
Cricketers from Maharashtra
Rising Pune Supergiant cricketers
Rajasthan Royals cricketers
Kolkata Knight Riders cricketers
Sunrisers Hyderabad cricketers